"Like Young" is a song written by André Previn with lyrics by Paul Francis Webster. An instrumental version by Previn and David Rose appeared on the album Like Young - Secret Songs For Young Lovers.

Chart performance
The Previn version peaked at #46 on the Billboard Hot 100 on the week of July 25, 1959. At the 2nd Annual Grammy Awards in November 29, 1959, "Like Young" won for Best Performance by an Orchestra and was a nominee for Song of the Year, Record of the Year, and Best Jazz Performance  – Soloist.

References 

1959 songs
Songs with music by André Previn
Songs with lyrics by Paul Francis Webster